Thomas Otis Knight (February 4, 1951 – January 7, 2014) was an American fugitive who was executed in Florida for murder. In 1974, Knight murdered a Miami couple after forcing them to withdraw $50,000 USD from a bank. While awaiting trial, Knight and ten other inmates escaped from jail and went on a crime spree, during which he murdered a store clerk in an armed robbery. He was added to the FBI Ten Most Wanted Fugitives list on December 12, 1974, and was captured on December 31, 1974.

Knight was sentenced to death in 1975 for the Miami murders. While on death row, he committed a fourth murder, in which he fatally stabbed a corrections officer. After spending thirty-nine years on death row, Knight was executed on January 7, 2014. He holds the record for spending the longest amount of time on death row in the United States before being executed. Knight was once described as a poster boy for the death penalty and his case has been referenced by supporters of capital punishment.

Early life
Knight was born on February 4, 1951, in Fort Pierce, Florida. He was the second oldest of nine children and came from a family with a history of mental illness. His father was a violent alcoholic who regularly beat his children and once raped Knight's sister in front of him. When Knight was nine, he was arrested for theft multiple times. At age fifteen, he was sent to state prison on a burglary conviction. He was later committed to the Northeast Florida State Hospital in Macclenny at the age of nineteen, where he was diagnosed with drug and poison intoxication and paranoid personality disorder.

Murders

Miami murders
On July 17, 1974, a then 23-year-old Knight approached his boss, Sydney Gans, in a parking lot. Armed with a rifle, Knight forced Gans into his car and ordered him to drive to his Miami Beach home and pick up his wife, Lillian Gans. Sydney obeyed Knight's demands and collected his wife. Knight then ordered the couple to drive to a bank in downtown Miami and withdraw $50,000 USD in cash. While Sydney went to collect the money, Lillian drove Knight around in the car. Inside the bank, Sydney withdrew the cash, but alerted people inside about the current situation. Staff at the bank called the FBI who then contacted the Miami Police Department. Sydney returned to the car with the money and the three of them drove off, with Miami police tailing the vehicle. The police lost sight of the vehicle momentarily but later found it at a secluded construction area with the doors left open. Police prepared to search the area but quickly spotted Knight, who was armed with the rifle. Knight fled on foot into some trees nearby and escaped. Officers then found the dead bodies of both Lillian and Sydney. Four and a half hours later, Knight was apprehended by the police. He was found with his rifle and the stolen $50,000 USD.

Prison break and manhunt

While awaiting trial for the murders of Sydney and Lillian Gans, Knight and ten other prisoners escaped from the Miami-Dade County Jail, on September 19, 1974. Two days later, eight of the eleven escapees were captured, with only Knight and two others remaining at large. While on the run, Knight committed several armed robberies and hold ups. On October 21, 1974, Knight and an accomplice held up a liquor store in Cordele, Georgia. The clerk, William Culpepper, was then shot three times by Knight during the robbery. Culpepper died at the scene and another clerk, A.V. Norton, was shot twice but survived. The pair stole $640 USD in the robbery.

On December 12, 1974, Knight was added to the FBI Ten Most Wanted Fugitives list. On December 31, 1974, an FBI SWAT team captured Knight at a rooming house in New Smyrna Beach, Florida. Despite being heavily armed and barricaded behind a door, Knight was overwhelmed by the FBI SWAT team and was arrested. At the time of his capture, Knight had an arsenal of weapons including a sawed-off shotgun, a 9mm automatic, and a .38 caliber revolver, all of which had been stolen from Titusville. Knight was the 328th fugitive to be placed on the FBI's Ten Most Wanted fugitives list and spent nearly three weeks on the list before being captured. Since his escape from jail, he spent just over three months as a fugitive before police apprehended him.

Death row murder
On April 21, 1975, Knight was sentenced to death for the murders of Sydney and Lillian Gans. On October 12, 1980, while on death row, Knight fatally stabbed state corrections officer Richard Burke with a sharpened spoon at Florida State Prison. The reason Knight killed him was reportedly because the prison would not let him see his mother, who was making her first visit to see him. According to court documents, Knight stabbed Burke as he was escorting him to the prison shower. The prison wanted Knight to shave his full beard off before seeing any visitors which had angered him. On January 20, 1983, Knight was sentenced to death again for the murder of Burke.

Execution
Knight's execution was delayed repeatedly because of multiple appeals and rulings. In 1987, a federal appeals court removed his original death sentence for the Miami murders because he had not been allowed to have any background witnesses on the stand during his penalty phase. He spent so long on death row that he was nearly granted a stay to hear a claim that it may be ruled unconstitutional to execute an inmate after such a long time on death row. The Supreme Court of the United States refused to hear his final appeals however.

Knight was executed on January 7, 2014, via lethal injection at Florida State Prison in Raiford, Florida. He was the first person to be executed in the United States in 2014. He spent a total of thirty-nine years on death row until his execution was carried out. He holds the record for spending the longest amount of time on death row in the United States before being executed. His last meal consisted of sweet potato pie, coconut cake, banana nut bread, a quarter bottle of Sprite, two tablespoons of strawberries, butter-pecan ice cream, vanilla ice cream and Fritos corn chips. He declined to make a final statement. While on death row, Knight converted to Islam and changed his name to Askari Abdullah Muhammad.

See also
 Capital punishment in Florida
 Capital punishment in the United States
 FBI Ten Most Wanted Fugitives, 1970s
 List of longest prison sentences served
 List of people executed in Florida
 List of people executed in the United States in 2014
 List of serial killers in the United States

References

1951 births
1974 murders in the United States
1980 murders in the United States
2014 deaths
20th-century African-American people
20th-century American criminals
21st-century African-American people
21st-century executions by Florida
21st-century executions of American people
American escapees
American male criminals
Executed African-American people
Executed American serial killers
Executed people from Florida
Fugitives
Male serial killers
People convicted of murder by Florida
People executed by Florida by lethal injection
People from Fort Pierce, Florida
People with paranoid personality disorder